The climate of Hyderabad is arid. Winds usually bring along clouds of dust, and people prefer staying indoors in the daytime, while the breezes at night are pleasant and clean.

In recent years Hyderabad has seen heavy downpours. In February 2003, Hyderabad received  of rain in 12 hours, due to a sudden climate change. The years 2006, 2007 and 2009 saw close competition to this record rainfall.

Weather

Factors
The monsoon and the Western Disturbance are the two main factors that change the weather over Hyderabad; otherwise, Continental air prevails for rest of the seasons. Following are the main factors that influence the weather over Hyderabad city.
Western Disturbances generally occur during the winter months and cause drizzle to light showers, temperatures also decrease due to it.
Dust storms occur rarely during the month of May and June.
Southeast Monsoon occurs in summer from the month of June till September. Monsoon rains bring much awaited relief from the scorching heat. These monsoon rains are quite heavy by nature and can cause significant flooding.
Continental air prevails during the period when there is no precipitation in the city.

Seasonal climate
Like other cities, Hyderabad has four seasons: winter, summer, autumn and spring. The monsoon season occurs in the Autumn.

Winter
The winter season begins in the month of December and lasts till February. The Western Disturbance influences the winter season. Light to moderate showers occur in winter, which decreases the temperature further due to the Western Disturbance. The highest monthly rainfall in winter  was recorded in February 2003. The fastest rainfall in 24 hours was also recorded on 18 February 2003:  was recorded in less than 12 hours.

Spring
The spring season begins in March and lasts till April. Being a dry city, Hyderabad's spring season is almost not felt. Rains are rare in the spring season. The highest monthly rainfall  was recorded in the month of March. The fastest rainfall in 24 hours  was recorded on 2 April 1963.

Summer

The summer season begins in May and lasts till September. Summer is the longest season in Hyderabad. Monsoon rains also occur in this season; these rains last from June till September. Extremely high temperatures are recorded in the summer. Heavy rains also occur during the monsoon season. The heaviest rainfall for Hyderabad also occurred in summer on September 12, 1962, when 250.7 mm of rain fell in 24 hours. The wettest month in Hyderabad is July. The highest monthly rainfall in summer  was recorded in September 1962. In June 2010, Cyclone Phet's moisture caused heavy downpours in the city; a total of  rainfall was recorded with 32 mph winds.

Autumn
This season begins in October and ends in November. Hazy and dry weather is the main factor of autumn. Showers do occur in this season late in November from the Western Disturbances. The highest monthly rainfall in autumn was 103.3 mm in October 2004, while the fastest 24-hour rainfall in autumn  was recorded on 3 October 2004. In October 2004, Cyclone Onil created havoc in the city, with  rainfall, and caused the drainage system to collapse.

Monsoon rainfall in Hyderabad
Following is the annual monsoon rainfall (June till September) since 2008. The following is the annual monsoon rainfall for the last few years based on data from the Pakistan Meteorological Department.

In 2003, a total of  rainfall was recorded.
In 2005, a total of  rainfall was recorded.
In 2006, a total of  rainfall was recorded.
In 2008, a total of  rainfall was recorded.
In 2009, a total of  rainfall was recorded.
In 2010, a total of  rainfall was recorded.
In 2011, a total of  rainfall was recorded.

See also
 Climate of Sindh
 Climate of Karachi
 Climate of Pakistan

References

External links
Pakistan Meteorological Department

Hyderabad
Hyderabad
Hyderabad District, Pakistan